Tina Struthers (1977) is a Canadian textile artist from Cape Town, South Africa. She is known for her 3-dimensional fabric and mixed media sculptures as well as her Cultural Mediation projects.

Biography
In 2008  Struthers moved to Canada with her family, first to Ontario, then finally settling in Quebec in 2011. She lives works in the greater Montreal region.

Education
1997–1999 Diploma in visual communication, fine art specialization, Open Window Art Academy, Pretoria, South Africa
1996–1997 Diploma in fine arts, Open Window Art Academy, Pretoria, South Africa

Career
Since early childhood Struthers has been assembling textiles. Textiles interest Struthers as they have endless variety, textures, and colours; they also capture movement and are a medium that are available almost everywhere.

Struther's work focuses on diversity, integration, human impacts on the environment, social transformation and immigration. She tries to capture flow, or the element of change within her work.  Struther's fascination with movement created by the wind, and the sea, began as a child in South Africa. Human displacement and human environmental degradation are viewed by her in the same flow lines as the wind and sea. A part of her interest in migration and refugees she relates to her own migration from South Africa to Canada.

Selected solo exhibitions
CODEX II, Mary E. Black Gallery, 2020, Halifax, Canada
CODEX, 2017 Galerie de la Ville, Dollard des Ormeaux, Canada
Soixante 17, 2017, Musée Régional de Vaudreuil-Soulanges, Canada
Racines au Carre, 2015, Salle Hélène-Rouette, L’Île-Bizard, Canada

Selected group exhibitions
16th International Triennial of Tapestry, 2019, Lodz, Poland
Contemporâneo, international textile art exhibition, 2019, Brazil
WorldTextile Association's International Biennial of Contemporary Textile Art; 2019, Madrid, Spain; 2017, Motevideo, Urgguay
Scythia, the 12th International Biennial of Contemporary Textile Art, 2018, Ivano-Frankivsk, Ukraine
The Brain Project, 2017; 2016, Toronto, Canada
International Textile Biennial 2017, Kunststichting Perspektief vzw, Haacht, Belgium

Selected Cultural Mediation Projects
Struthers has been involved in various cultural mediation projects throughout the greater Montreal region supported by the municipalities there.

La Danse des Mains (the Dance of the Hands)
Sculpture inside Salle Pauline Julien, 15615 Boul Gouin O, Sainte-Geneviève, QC, 2019

307 participants, including adult students in francization at Cégep Gérald-Godin, special education classes from the Marguerite-Bourgeoys School and l'école Secondaire Saint-George worked alongside Struthers making hands out of wire that were then covered in tissue paper. These hands were turned into two large multi-pronged pretzel shapes. Inspired by her own isolation when moving to Quebec without speaking French, Struthers worked with others to whom body language was needed for communication. This bodily communication is represented by the Dance of the Hands.

Ligne's d'eau
interior textile wall installations and one outdoor sculpture, 2018–2019,
2017 Quebec flood victims were invited to participate and create works that used the idea of water lines as a starting point. Yarn and copper symbolizing the danger of raising water and electricity were used. The project encompassed six locations.
textile installation inside the community centre: 394 Rue Main, Hudson, QC
outside sculpture corner of Chemin des Cheneaux, and Boul. De La Cité-Des-Jeunes, Vaudreuil-Dorion, QC,
textile installation inside the town hall, 44 Rue de l'Église, Vaudreuil-sur-le-Lac, QC
textile installation inside the Library 102 Rue Saint-Pierre, Rigaud, QC
textile installation inside the community centre, 74, 7e Avenue Terrasse-Vaudreuil, QC
textile installation inside the community centre, 694 rue Tisseur, Pointe-Fortune,QC

Je m'attache a la culture (I am attached to the Culture)
Sculpture inside 190 Avenue Saint Charles, Vaudreuil-Dorion QC, 2014

Through various public and community events, Struthers had over 1500 participants committing to the idea of culture and writing their name on a long thin piece of cloth. These clothes were then sewed into long rolls and placed onto a series of large meandering interlocked circles forming a Gordian Knot that were created out of soft 17" tubing. The finished work was approximately 10 feet long by three feet wide and 7 feet tall.

Public Sculptures, from Cultural mediation Projects
Le Flux de L'Or Bleu, textile installation in the Théâtre Paul-Émile Meloche 400 Avenue Saint-Charles, Vaudreuil-Dorion, QC, 2019
Vibrer Ensemble Sculpture is outside Centre des Femmes la Moisson,321 Grand Boulevard, L'Île-Perrot, QC, 2019
Unité dans la Diversité, Sculpture on corner of avenue saint Charles, and Boulevard Harwood autoroute 20, Ville de Vaudreuil-Dorion,2018
Au Fil des Terres textile installation inside the Regional Municipality Counsel Hall de Vaudreuil-Soulanges, 280 Boulevard Harwood, 2017
Mon Nid Chez Moi, 23 panel textile installation inside 3031/309 Boulevard de la Gare, Vaudreuil-Dorion QC, 2015
Plus Haut Plus Loin, suspended sculpture inside City Hall, 2555 Rue Dutrisac, Vaudreuil-Dorion, 2015

Public sculptures
Travaillons Ensemble, sculpture on the corner of Avenue Saint charles and rue Paul Gerin-Lajoie, Vaudreuil-Dorion QC, 2016 with Monika Brinkman & Mozaik
Au Coeur de ma Communauté, outside wall mural, Avenue Saint Charles Vaudreuil-Dorion QC, 2015 with Monica Brinkman.

Awards
Artist of the Year 1996 Merit Award, Pretoria, South-Africa, South African Art Society
ideau Partnership Award 2020 for La Danse des Mains

References

External links
 vaudreuil-dorion city Cultural Mediation website

1977 births
Living people
21st-century women textile artists
21st-century textile artists
21st-century Canadian women artists
21st-century Canadian artists
Canadian textile artists
21st-century South African women artists
Artists from Cape Town
South African textile artists